Sproing may refer to:

 Sproing Interactive Media, an Austrian video game developer.
 The Sproing Award, a Norwegian comic award.